NSVS 14256825, also known as V1828 Aquilae, is an eclipsing binary system (of the Algol type) in the constellation of Aquila.  The system comprises a subdwarf OB star and red dwarf star. The two stars orbit each other every 2.648976 hours. Based on the stellar parallax of the system, observed by Gaia, the system is located approximately 2,700 light-years (840 parsecs) away.

Nomenclature 
The system is most commonly referred to using its designation from the Northern Sky Variability Survey (NSVS), a survey of stars with apparent magnitudes between 8 and 15.5. It also has a variable star designation, V1828 Aquilae.

Eclipse timing variations 
NSVS 14256825 has been extremely well-studied using photometry, but the resulting models often contradict each other, even with similar statistical significance, or with data that are collected later. Many studies have found that this system exhibits eclipse timing variations (ETVs) that are significant, cyclic and not explainable by other stellar mechanisms such as the Applegate mechanism. In 2012, it was found that the orbit of NSVS 14256825 was increasing at a rate of  days per orbit.

Initially, in 2012 it was claimed that two giant planets were in orbit around the binary, with masses of 2.9 and 8.1 times the mass of Jupiter orbiting with periods of 3.5 and 6.9 years respectively. Another paper claimed the existence of one planet with a mass 12 times that of Jupiter, in a 20-year orbit. Studies also do not agree on whether one substellar body can explain the ETVs, or whether additional companions are necessary, but further research is needed to obtain better coverage of data.

See also 
 HW Virginis
 CM Draconis
 QS Virginis
 NN Serpentis 
 List of extrasolar planets

References 

Algol variables
Eclipsing binaries
Aquila (constellation)
Aquilae, V1828
O-type subdwarfs
M-type main-sequence stars
J20200045+0437564